Camborne Urban District was an urban district in Cornwall, England, based on Camborne. It was created in 1894 and abolished in 1934 when it was absorbed by Camborne-Redruth Urban District.

References

External links

 Camborne UD archives at The National Archives
 Archives at Cornwall Council

Urban districts of England
Camborne
Local government in Cornwall